Gennaro Papi (December 21, 1886 – November 29, 1941) was an Italian operatic conductor known for his work with the Metropolitan Opera and Chicago Civic Opera companies.

A native of Naples, Papi studied at the conservatory in that city, holding various posts as conductor and choirmaster after his graduation. He came to the United States in 1913, becoming Arturo Toscanini's assistant on the conducting staff of the Metropolitan Opera in New York City. When Toscanini left the Met rather suddenly in 1915, Papi became the house's principal conductor, making his debut in that position on November 16, 1916, with Giacomo Puccini's Manon Lescaut. He left the Met in 1927 to become the first conductor of the Chicago Civic Opera, but returned to his old post in 1935.

Papi had collapsed and was found dead in his apartment just hours before he was to conduct a performance of La traviata at the Metropolitan on November 29, 1941; the performance, which was broadcast over the radio by NBC, marked the company debut of tenor Jan Peerce. Ettore Panizza instead conducted. News of Papi's death was intended to be withheld from the company until the performance ended, though the entire cast knew by the end of the first act.

References
David Ewen, Encyclopedia of the Opera: New Enlarged Edition. New York; Hill and Wang, 1963.
Liner notes of "Lebendige Vergangenheit: Jan Peerce"

1886 births
1941 deaths
Italian male conductors (music)
Musicians from Naples
Italian emigrants to the United States
20th-century Italian conductors (music)
20th-century Italian male musicians